The Hamburg Museum of Work is a museum in Hamburg-Barmbek. Its major theme is changes in work and living during the last 150 years. It examines and displays the social cultural and economic effects of  industrialisation. The museum is an anchor point on the  European Route of Industrial Heritage (ERIH).

History 
The museum was planned in the 1970s, and a site was obtained in 1980. In 1982 it took over the buildings of the former  in Barmbek, these buildings dated from 1871. It put to together a provisional display and opened that year. With a permanent workshop it was able to develop the themes and grow the collection. Construction started in 1992, and the first building, the boiler-house was inaugurated in 1994. Further conversions followed and permanent exhibition hall in the  '' opened on 5 January 1997. The first director was Gernot Krankenhagen (1997–2004), followed by Lisa Kosok (2004–2008) and Kirsten Baumann (2009–2013). The current director is Rita Müller.

Exhibits

Permanent displays 

The collection of the original owners, the New-York Hamburger Gummi-Waaren with documents showing its history. 

who worked with enamel.
The Office of a Hanseatic Trading company from the nineteenth century through to the 1950s.

Outside the museum is the cutting head of tunnel boring machine,  TRUDE, used in cutting the tunnels under the Elbe.

Temporary exhibitions 
 From 2010 until 2011  Made in Hamburg – 100 Years of Reemtsma
 In celebration of the 100th anniversary of the  Elbe Tunnel, there was an exhibition  (Tunnel: Hamburg and its underworld), a deliberate word play on the history, meaning, and significance of tunnel building to the city.
 2013/2014: Photo exhibition  (Migrant Labour).
 5 November 2015 until 3 April 2016:  (Forced labour). The Germans, forced labour and the war.

Subsidiary site- Hafenmuseum

References 

European Route of Industrial Heritage Anchor Points
Museums in Hamburg
Technology museums
Buildings and structures in Hamburg-Nord